I Am a Cat is a 2017 children's picture book by Galia Bernstein. It is about a tabby cat called Simon who persuades some big cats that he is a cat, just like them.

Publication history
2018, USA, Abrams Books 
2017, Australia, Abrams Books for Young Readers

Reception
In a starred review of I Am a Cat Publishers Weekly wrote "Bernstein’s debut is a fresh, powerful twist on the tension between in-groups and out-groups."

Other reviews of I Am a Cat appear in Booklist, School Library Journal, Kirkus Reviews, The Bulletin of the Center for Children's Books, The Wall Street Journal, and the Chicago Tribune.

It is a 2019-20 Prairie Bud winner.

References

External links

Library holdings of I Am a Cat

2017 children's books
Books about cats
American picture books
Australian picture books